Sarah Caroline Jarvis    FRCGP (born 3 December 1962) is a general practitioner, broadcaster, and television doctor.

Career 
She qualified as a medical doctor in July 1986 from University of Oxford with a BM BCh, having graduated from the University of Cambridge with a degree in nutrition in 1983, and was awarded the Fellowship of the Royal College of General Practitioners.

Sarah recently resigned as a partner and GP trainerafter 27 years in her  Shepherd's Bush practice and now works as a locum. She joined the practice in 1990.

She is also the health and medical reporter for The One Show, a television doctor on Good Morning Britain, ITV News and Jeremy Vine, and is a regular guest on The Jeremy Vine Show, which airs weekdays on BBC Radio 2 from 12pm until 2pm and is the Clinical Director for health website Patient UK.

Sarah was awarded an MBE in the 2018 New Year Honours list for services to general practice and public understanding of health.

Personal life 
Sarah was educated at Millfield, Street, Somerset. She lives in Warwickshire with her husband, Tim, and their springer spaniel. She is a keen gardener and enjoys walking and scuba diving.

Selected works

References

External links

1962 births
Alumni of the University of Oxford
20th-century English medical doctors
British television personalities
Living people
English women medical doctors
Place of birth missing (living people)
21st-century English medical doctors
People educated at Millfield
Members of the Order of the British Empire
20th-century women physicians
21st-century women physicians
20th-century English women
20th-century English people
21st-century English women